1994 ACC tournament may refer to:

 1994 ACC men's basketball tournament
 1994 ACC women's basketball tournament
 1994 ACC men's soccer tournament
 1994 ACC women's soccer tournament
 1994 Atlantic Coast Conference baseball tournament
 1994 Atlantic Coast Conference softball tournament